Robert Mac Wattin, alias Robert Barrett, Anglo-Irish lord, fl. 1413.

Biography
Mac Wattin was a member of a branch of the Barrett family of north Connacht, descended from a Batin or Wattin Barrett, alive c. 1300. (Knox, p. 121). 

According to an entry sub anno 1413 in the Annals of the Four Masters, 

Henry Barrett was taken prisoner in the church of Airech-Locha-Con (Lough Conn) by Mac Wattin (i.e. Robert), who carried him away by force, after profaning the place. But Mac Wattin passed not a night in which the saint of the place (Tigearnan of Airech) did not appear to him in a vision, demanding the prisoner, until he obtained his request at last; and Mac Wattin granted a quarter of land to Tighearnan Airich for ever, as an eric for having violated him.

Knox lists him as a son of Henry Mer Mac Wattin (died 1399), making him a great-great grandson of Batin Barrett. Robert's great-grandson, Richard, would become Bishop of Killala.

References
The History of Mayo, H.T. Knox, 1902, pp. 121 & 416.

External links
http://www.ucc.ie/celt/online/T100005D/text005.html

People from County Mayo
15th-century Irish people